Gauromydas heros is a species of giant fly belonging to the family Mydidae. It is the largest species of the entire order of Diptera or true flies.

Distribution
This species has a Neotropical distribution (Brazil, Bolivia, Paraguay).

Description

It is the largest fly known. The wing membrane is whitish, brown or orange, with a hyaline apex and a posterior margin.

Biology
Adult males are flower visitors, while females do not feed at all. Larvae live in the nest of ants (Atta species), feeding on immature insects. Mature larva dig a pupation chamber in the soil. Then the imago emerges.

See also 

 List of largest insects

References 

 
Insects described in 1833
Taxa named by Maximilian Perty